Aetnaeus was an epithet given to several Greek and Roman gods and mythical beings connected with Mount Aetna, such as Zeus, of whom there was a statue on Mount Aetna, and to whom a festival was celebrated there, called Aetnaea, Hephaestus, who had his workshop in the mountain, and a temple near it, and the Cyclops.

Notes

References 

 Publius Ovidius Naso, Letters From Pontus translated by A. S. Kline, © Copyright 2003. Online version at the Topos Text Project.
 Publius Ovidius Naso, Ex Ponto. Arthur Leslie Wheeler. Cambridge, MA. Harvard University Press. 1939. Latin text available at the Perseus Digital Library.
 Publius Vergilius Maro, Aeneid. Theodore C. Williams. trans. Boston. Houghton Mifflin Co. 1910. Online version at the Perseus Digital Library.
 Publius Vergilius Maro, Bucolics, Aeneid, and Georgics. J. B. Greenough. Boston. Ginn & Co. 1900. Latin text available at the Perseus Digital Library.

Roman mythology
Epithets of Hephaestus

Epithets of Zeus